Ian Wood (born 24 May 1958) is an English former footballer who played in the Football League for Aldershot and Mansfield Town.

References

English footballers
English Football League players
1958 births
Living people
Mansfield Town F.C. players
Aldershot F.C. players
Boston United F.C. players
People from Kirkby-in-Ashfield
Footballers from Nottinghamshire
Association football defenders